Idealno loša (English: Ideally Bad) is the thirteenth studio album by Serbian pop-folk singer Ceca. It was released on 17 June 2006.

Track listing

References

2006 albums
Ceca (singer) albums